The following are examples of orders of magnitude for different lengths.



Overview

Detailed list
To help compare different orders of magnitude, the following list describes various lengths between  metres and metres.

Subatomic scale

Atomic to cellular scale

Cellular to human scale

Human to astronomical scale

Astronomical scale

Less than 1 zeptometre

To help compare different orders of magnitude, this section lists lengths shorter than 10−21 m (1 zm).

1.6 × 10−5 quectometres (1.6 × 10−35 metres) – the Planck length (Measures of distance shorter than this do not make physical sense, according to current theories of physics.)
1 qm – 1 quectometre, the smallest named subdivision of the metre in the SI base unit of length, one nonillionth of a metre.
1 rm – 1 rontometre, a subdivision of the metre in the SI base unit of length, one octillionth of a metre.
10 rm – the length of one side of a square whose area is one shed, a unit of target cross section used in nuclear physics
2 ym – the effective cross-section radius of 1 MeV neutrinos as measured by Clyde Cowan and Frederick Reines

1 zeptometre

To help compare different orders of magnitude, this section lists lengths between 10−21 m and 10−20 m (1 zm and 10 zm).

2 zm – the upper bound for the width of a cosmic string in string theory.
2 zm – radius of effective cross section for a 20 GeV neutrino scattering off a nucleon
7 zm – radius of effective cross section for a 250 GeV neutrino scattering off a nucleon

10 zeptometres
To help compare different orders of magnitude, this section lists lengths between 10−20 m and 10−19 m (10 zm and 100 zm).

100 zeptometres
To help compare different orders of magnitude, this section lists lengths between 10−19 m and 10−18 m (100 zm and 1 am).

177 zm – de Broglie wavelength of protons at the Large Hadron Collider (7 TeV as of 2010)

1 attometre

To help compare different orders of magnitude, this section lists lengths between 10−18 m and 10−17 m (1 am and 10 am).

1 am – sensitivity of the LIGO detector for gravitational waves
1 am – upper limit for the size of quarks and electrons

10 attometres
To help compare different orders of magnitude, this section lists lengths between 10−17 m and 10−16 m (10 am and 100 am).

10 am – range of the weak force

86 am – Charge radius of a Bottom eta meson

100 attometres
To help compare different orders of magnitude, this section lists lengths between 10−16 m and 10−15 m (100 am and 1 fm).

850 am – approximate proton radius

1 femtometre

To help compare different orders of magnitude, this section lists lengths between 10−15 metres and 10−14 metres (1 femtometre and 10 fm).

1 fm – diameter of a neutron, approximate range-limit of the color force carried between quarks by gluons
1.5 fm – diameter of the scattering cross section of an 11 MeV proton with a target proton
1.75 fm – the effective charge diameter of a proton
2.81794 fm – classical electron radius
3 fm – approximate range-limit of the nuclear binding force mediated by mesons
7 fm – the radius of the effective scattering cross section for a gold nucleus scattering a 6 MeV alpha particle over 140 degrees

10 femtometres
To help compare different orders of magnitude, this section lists lengths between 10−14 m and 10−13 m (10 fm and 100 fm).

1.75 to 15 fm – Diameter range of the atomic nucleus
30.8568 fm – 1 quectoparsec (10−30 parsecs)

100 femtometres
To help compare different orders of magnitude, this section lists lengths between 10−13 m and 10−12 m (100 fm and 1 pm).

570 fm – typical distance from the atomic nucleus of the two innermost electrons (electrons in the 1s shell) in the uranium atom, the heaviest naturally-occurring atom

1 picometre

To help compare different orders of magnitude this section lists lengths between 10−12 and 10−11 m (1 pm and 10 pm).

1 pm – distance between atomic nuclei in a white dwarf
1 pm – reference value of particle displacement in acoustics
2.4 pm – The Compton wavelength of an electron
5 pm – shorter X-ray wavelengths (approx.)

10 picometres
To help compare different orders of magnitude this section lists lengths between 10−11 and 10−10 m (10 pm and 100 pm).

25 pm – approximate radius of a helium atom, the smallest neutral atom
30.8568 pm – 1 rontoparsec
50 pm – radius of a hydrogen atom
50 pm – bohr radius: approximate radius of a hydrogen atom
~50 pm – best resolution of a high-resolution transmission electron microscope
60 pm – radius of a carbon atom
93 pm – length of a diatomic carbon molecule
96 pm – H–O bond length in a water molecule

100 picometres
To help compare different orders of magnitude this section lists lengths between 10−10 and 10−9 m (100 pm and 1 nm; 1 Å and 10 Å).

100 pm – 1 ångström
100 pm – covalent radius of sulfur atom
120 pm – van der Waals radius of a neutral hydrogen atom
120 pm – radius of a gold atom
126 pm – covalent radius of ruthenium atom
135 pm – covalent radius of technetium atom
150 pm – Length of a typical covalent bond (C–C)
153 pm – covalent radius of silver atom
155 pm – covalent radius of zirconium atom
175 pm – covalent radius of thulium atom
200 pm – highest resolution of a typical electron microscope
225 pm – covalent radius of caesium atom
280 pm – Average size of the water molecule
298 pm – radius of a caesium atom, calculated to be the largest atomic radius (except possibly francium)
340 pm – thickness of single layer graphene
356.68 pm – width of diamond unit cell
403 pm – width of lithium fluoride unit cell
500 pm – Width of protein α helix
543 pm – silicon lattice spacing
560 pm – width of sodium chloride unit cell
700 pm – width of glucose molecule
700 pm – diameter of a buckyball
780 pm – mean width of quartz unit cell
820 pm – mean width of ice unit cell
900 pm – mean width of coesite unit cell

1 nanometre

To help compare different orders of magnitude, this section lists lengths between 10−9 and 10−8 m (1 nm and 10 nm).

1 nm – diameter of a carbon nanotube
1 nm – roughly the length of a sucrose molecule, calculated by Albert Einstein
2.3 nm – length of a phospholipid
2.3 nm – smallest gate oxide thickness in microprocessors
3 nm – width of a DNA helix
3 nm – flying height of the head of a hard disk
3 nm – , the average half-pitch of a memory cell expected to be manufactured circa 2022
3.4 nm – length of a DNA turn (10 bp)
3.8 nm – size of an albumin molecule
5 nm – size of the gate length of a 16 nm processor
5 nm – , the average half-pitch of a memory cell manufactured circa 2019–2020
6 nm – length of a phospholipid bilayer
6–10 nm – thickness of cell membrane
6.8 nm – width of a haemoglobin molecule
7 nm – diameter of actin filaments
7 nm – the average half-pitch of a memory cell manufactured circa 2018
10 nm – Thickness of cell wall in Gram-negative bacteria

10 nanometres

To help compare different orders of magnitude this section lists lengths between 10−8 and 10−7 m (10 nm and 100 nm).

10 nm – the average length of a nanowire
10 nm – lower size of tobacco smoke
10 nm – the average half-pitch of a memory cell manufactured circa 2016–2017
13 nm – the length of the wavelength that is used for EUV lithography
14 nm – Length of a porcine circovirus
14 nm – the average half-pitch of a memory cell manufactured circa 2013
15 nm – Length of an antibody
18 nm – diameter of tobacco mosaic virus 
20 nm – Length of a nanobe, could be one of the smallest forms of life
20–80 nm – thickness of cell wall in Gram-positive bacteria
20 nm – thickness of bacterial flagellum
22 nm – the average half-pitch of a memory cell manufactured circa 2011–2012
22 nm – Smallest feature size of production microprocessors in September 2009
25 nm – diameter of a microtubule
30 nm – lower size of cooking oil smoke
30.8568 nm – 1 yoctoparsec
32 nm – the average half-pitch of a memory cell manufactured circa 2009–2010
40 nm – extreme ultraviolet wavelength
45 nm – the average half-pitch of a memory cell manufactured circa 2007–2008
50 nm – upper size for airborne virus particles
50 nm – flying height of the head of a hard disk
65 nm – the average half-pitch of a memory cell manufactured circa 2005–2006
58 nm – height of a T7 bacteriophage
90 nm – Human immunodeficiency virus (HIV) (generally, viruses range in size from 20 nm to 450 nm)
90 nm – the average half-pitch of a memory cell manufactured circa 2002–2003
100 nm – Length of a mesoporous silica nanoparticle

100 nanometres

To help compare different orders of magnitude, this section lists lengths between 10−7 and 10−6 m (100 nm and 1 μm).

100 nm – greatest particle size that can fit through a surgical mask
100 nm – 90% of particles in wood smoke are smaller than this.
120 nm – greatest particle size that can fit through a ULPA filter
120 nm – diameter of a human immunodeficiency virus (HIV)
120 nm – approximate diameter of SARS-CoV-2
125 nm – standard depth of pits on compact discs (width: 500 nm, length: 850 nm to 3.5 μm)
180 nm – typical length of the rabies virus
200 nm – typical size of a Mycoplasma bacterium, among the smallest bacteria
300–400 nm – near ultraviolet wavelength
300 nm – greatest particle size that can fit through a HEPA (high efficiency particulate air) filter (N100 removes up to 99.97% at 0.3 micrometres, N95 removes up to 95% at 0.3 micrometres)
400–420 nm – wavelength of violet light (see Color and Visible spectrum)
420–440 nm – wavelength of indigo light 
440–500 nm – wavelength of blue light
500–520 nm – wavelength of cyan light 
520–565 nm – wavelength of green light 
565–590 nm – wavelength of yellow light 
590–625 nm – wavelength of orange light 
625–700 nm – wavelength of red light 
700–1.4 μm – wavelength of near-infrared radiation

1 micrometre

To help compare different orders of magnitude, this section lists some items with lengths between 10−6 and 10−5 m (between 1 and 10 micrometres, or μm).

~0.7–300 μm – wavelength of infrared radiation
1 μm – the side of a square of area 10−12 m2
1 μm – edge of cube of volume 10−18 m3 (1 fL)
1–10 μm – diameter of a typical bacterium
1 μm – length of a lysosome
1–2 μm – anthrax spore
2 μm – length of an average E. coli bacteria
3–4 μm – size of a typical yeast cell
5 μm – length of a typical human spermatozoon's head
6 μm – thickness of the tape in a 120-minute (C120) compact cassette
7 μm – diameter of the nucleus of a typical eukaryotic cell
about 7 μm – diameter of human red blood cells
3–8 μm – width of strand of spider web silk
5–10 μm – width of a chloroplast
8–11 μm – size of a ground-level fog or mist droplet

10 micrometres

To help compare different orders of magnitude, this section lists lengths between 10−5 m and 10−4 m (10 μm and 100 μm).

10 μm – width of cotton fibre
10 μm – tolerance of a Lego brick
10 μm – transistor width of the Intel 4004, the world's first commercial microprocessor
10 μm – mean longest dimension of a human red blood cell
5–20 μm – dust mite excreta
10.6 μm – wavelength of light emitted by a carbon dioxide laser
15 μm – width of silk fibre
17 μm – minimum width of a strand of human hair
17.6 μm – one twip, a unit of length in typography
10 to 55 μm – width of wool fibre
25.4 μm – 1/1,000 inch, commonly referred to as 1 mil in the U.S. and 1 thou in the UK
30 μm – length of a human skin cell
30.8568 μm – 1 zeptoparsec
50 μm – typical length of Euglena gracilis, a flagellate protist
50 μm – typical length of a human liver cell, an average-sized body cell
50 μm – length of a silt particle
60 μm – length of a sperm cell
70 to 180 μm – thickness of paper

100 micrometres

To help compare different orders of magnitude, this section lists lengths between 10−4 m and 10−3 m (100 μm and 1 mm). The term myriometre (abbr. mom, equivalent to 100 micrometres; frequently confused with the myriametre, 10 kilometres) is deprecated; the decimal metric prefix myrio- is obsolete and was not included among the prefixes when the International System of Units was introduced in 1960.

100 μm – 1/10 of a millimetre
100 μm – 0.00394 inches
100 μm – smallest distance that can be seen with the naked eye
100 μm – average diameter of a strand of human hair
100 μm – thickness of a coat of paint
100 μm – length of a dust particle
120 μm – the geometric mean of the Planck length and the diameter of the observable universe: 
120 μm – diameter of a human ovum
170 μm – length of the largest sperm cell in nature, belonging to the Drosophila bifurca fruit fly
181 μm – maximum width of a strand of human hair
100–400 μm – length of Demodex mites living in human hair follicles
175–200 μm – typical thickness of a solar cell.
200 μm – typical length of Paramecium caudatum, a ciliate protist
200 μm – nominal width of the smallest commonly available mechanical pencil lead (0.2 mm)
250–300 μm – length of a dust mite
340 μm – length of a pixel on a 17-inch monitor with a resolution of 1024×768
500 μm – typical length of Amoeba proteus, an amoeboid protist

500 μm – average length of a grain of sand
500 μm – average length of a grain of salt
500 μm – average length of a grain of sugar
560 μm – thickness of the central area of a human cornea
750 μm – diameter of a Thiomargarita namibiensis, the largest bacteria known
760 μm – thickness of an identification card

1 millimetre

To help compare different orders of magnitude, this section lists lengths between 10−3 m and 10−2 m (1 mm and 1 cm).

1.0 mm – 1/1,000 of a metre
1.0 mm – 0.03937 inches or 5/127 (exactly)
1.0 mm – side of a square of area 1 mm²
1.0 mm – diameter of a pinhead
1.5 mm – average length of a flea
2.54 mm – distance between pins on old dual in-line package (DIP) electronic components
5 mm – length of an average red ant
5 mm – diameter of an average grain of rice
5.56×45mm NATO – standard ammunition size
6 mm – approximate width of a pencil
7 mm – length of a Paedophryne amauensis, the smallest-known vertebrate
7.1 mm – length of a sunflower seed
7.62×51mm NATO – common military ammunition size
8 mm – width of old-format home movie film
8 mm – length of a Paedocypris progenetica, the smallest-known fish

1 centimetre

To help compare different orders of magnitude, this section lists lengths between 10−2 m and 10−1 m (1 cm and 1 dm).

1 cm – 10 millimetres
1 cm – 0.39 inches
1 cm – edge of a square of area 1 cm2
1 cm – edge of a cube of volume 1 mL
1 cm – length of a coffee bean
1 cm – approximate width of average fingernail
1.2 cm – length of a bee
1.2 cm – diameter of a die
1.5 cm – length of a very large mosquito
1.6 cm – length of a Jaragua Sphaero, a very small reptile
1.7 cm – length of a Thorius arboreus, the smallest salamander
2 cm – approximate width of an adult human finger
2.54 cm – 1 inch
3.08568 cm – 1 attoparsec
3.4 cm – length of a quail egg
3.5 cm – width of film commonly used in motion pictures and still photography
3.78 cm – amount of distance the Moon moves away from Earth each year
4.3 cm – minimum diameter of a golf ball
5 cm – usual diameter of a chicken egg
5 cm – height of a hummingbird, the smallest-known bird
5.5 × 5.5 × 5.5 cm – dimensions of a 3x3x3 Rubik's cube
6.1 cm – average height of an apple
7.3–7.5 cm – diameter of a baseball
8.6 cm × 5.4 cm – dimensions of a standard credit card
9 cm – length of a speckled padloper, the smallest-known turtle

1 decimetre

To help compare different orders of magnitude, this section lists lengths between 10 centimetres and 100 centimetres (10−1 metre and 1 metre).

Conversions
10 centimetres (abbreviated to 10 cm) is equal to:

1 decimetre (dm), a term not in common use (1 L = 1 dm3.)
100 millimetres
3.9 inches
a side of a square of area 0.01 m2
the edge of a cube with a volume of  m3 (1 L)

Wavelengths
10 cm = 1.0 dm – wavelength of the highest UHF radio frequency, 3 GHz
12 cm = 1.2 dm – wavelength of the 2.45 GHz ISM radio band
21 cm = 2.1 dm – wavelength of the 1.4 GHz hydrogen emission line, a hyperfine transition of the hydrogen atom
100 cm = 10 dm – wavelength of the lowest UHF radio frequency, 300 MHz

Human-defined scales and structures
10.16 cm = 1.016 dm – 1 hand used in measuring height of horses (4 inches)
12 cm = 1.2 dm – diameter of a compact disc (CD) (= 120 mm)
15 cm = 1.5 dm – length of a Bic pen with cap on
22 cm = 2.2 dm – diameter of a typical association football (soccer ball)
30 cm = 3 dm – typical school-use ruler length (= 300 mm)
30.48 cm = 3.048 dm – 1 foot (measure)
60 cm = 6 dm – standard depth (front to back) of a domestic kitchen worktop in Europe (= 600 mm)
90 cm = 9 dm – average length of a rapier, a fencing sword
91.44 cm = 9.144 dm – one yard (measure)

Nature
10 cm = 1 dm – diameter of the human cervix upon entering the second stage of labour
11 cm = 1.1 dm – diameter of an average potato in the US
13 cm = 1.3 dm – body length of a Goliath birdeater
15 cm = 1.5 dm – approximate size of largest beetle species
19 cm = 1.9 dm – length of a banana
26.3 cm = 2.6 dm – length of average male human foot
29.98 cm = 2.998 dm – distance light in vacuum travels in one nanosecond
30 cm = 3.0 dm – maximum leg length of a Goliath birdeater
31 cm = 3.1 dm – wingspan of largest butterfly species Ornithoptera alexandrae
46 cm = 4.6 dm – length of an average domestic cat
50 to 65 cm = 5–6.5 dm – a coati's tail
66 cm = 6.6 dm – length of the longest pine cones (produced by the sugar pine)

Astronomical
84 cm = 8.4 dm – approximate diameter of 2008 TS26, a meteoroid

1 metre

To help compare different orders of magnitude, this section lists lengths between one metre and ten metres.

Conversions
1 metre is:
10 decimetres
100 centimetres
1,000 millimetres
39.37 inches
3.28 feet
1.1 yards
side of square with area 1 m2
edge of cube with surface area 6 m2 and volume 1 m3
radius of circle with area π m2
radius of sphere with surface area 4π m2 and volume 4/3π m3

Human-defined scales and structures
1 m – approximate height of the top part of a doorknob on a door
1 m – diameter of a very large beach ball
1.435 m – standard gauge of railway track used by about 60% of railways in the world = 4 ft 8 in
2.5 m – distance from the floor to the ceiling in an average residential house
2.7 m – length of the Starr Bumble Bee II, the smallest plane
2.77–3.44 m – wavelength of the broadcast radio FM band 87–108 MHz
3.05 m – the length of an old Mini
8.38 m – the length of a London Bus (AEC Routemaster)

Sports
2.44 m – height of an association football goal
2.45 m – highest high jump by a human (Javier Sotomayor)
3.05 m – (10 feet) height of the basket in basketball
8.95 m – longest long jump by a human (Mike Powell)

Nature
1 m – height of Homo floresiensis (the "Hobbit")

1.15 m – a pizote (mammal)
1.63 m – (5 feet 4 inches) (or 64 inches) – height of average U.S. female human  (source: U.S. Centers for Disease Control and Prevention (CDC))
1.75 m – (5 feet 8 inches) – height of average U.S. male human  (source: U.S. CDC as per female above)
2.5 m – height of a sunflower
2.72 m – (8 feet 11 inches) – tallest-known human (Robert Wadlow)
3.63 m – the record wingspan for living birds (a wandering albatross)
5 m – length of an elephant
5.2 m – height of a giraffe
5.5 m – height of a Baluchitherium, the largest land mammal ever lived
6.5 m – wingspan of Argentavis, the largest flying bird known
7.4 m – wingspan of Pelagornis, the bird with longest wingspan ever.
7.5 m – approximate length of the human gastrointestinal tract

Astronomical
4.1 m – diameter of 2008 TC3, a small asteroid that flew into the Earth's atmosphere on October 7, 2008

1 decametre

The  is a unit of length in the metric system equal to 10 metres (101 m). 
To help compare different orders of magnitude, this section lists lengths between 10 and 100 metres.

Conversions
10 metres (very rarely termed a decametre which is abbreviated as dam) is equal to:
10 metres
100 decimetres
1,000 centimetres
10,000 millimetres
32.8 feet
11 yards
side of a square with area 100 m²

Human-defined scales and structures
10 metres – wavelength of the highest shortwave radio frequency, 30 MHz
23 metres – height of the obelisk of the Place de la Concorde, Paris, France
25 metres – wavelength of the broadcast radio shortwave band at 12 MHz
29 metres – height of the lighthouse at Savudrija, Croatia
31 metres – wavelength of the broadcast radio shortwave band at 9.7 MHz
32 metres - length of one arcsecond of latitude on the surface of the Earth
34 metres – height of the Split Point Lighthouse in Aireys Inlet, Victoria, Australia
40 metres – average depth beneath the seabed of the Channel tunnel
49 metres – wavelength of the broadcast radio shortwave band at 6.1 MHz
50 metres – length of a road train
55 metres – height of the Leaning Tower of Pisa
62.5 metres – height of Pyramid of Djoser
64 metres – wingspan of a Boeing 747-400
69 metres – wingspan of an Antonov An-124 Ruslan
70 metres – length of the Bayeux Tapestry
70 metres – width of a typical association football field
77 metres – wingspan of a Boeing 747-8
88.4 metres – wingspan of an Antonov An-225 Mriya transport aircraft
93 metres – height of the Statue of Liberty
96 metres – height of Big Ben
100 metres – wavelength of the lowest shortwave radio frequency, 3 MHz

Sports
11 metres – approximate width of a doubles tennis court
15 metres – width of a standard FIBA basketball court
15.24 metres – width of an NBA]basketball court (50 feet)
18.44 metres – distance between the front of the pitcher's rubber and the rear point of home plate on a baseball field (60 feet, 6 inches)
20 metres – length of cricket pitch (22 yards)
27.43 metres – distance between bases on a baseball field (90 feet)
28 metres – length of a standard FIBA basketball court
28.65 metres – length of an NBA basketball court (94 feet)
49 metres – width of an American football field (53 yards)
59.436 metres – width of a Canadian football field (65 yards)
70 metres – typical width of a association football field
91 metres – length of an American football field (100 yards, measured between the goal lines)

Nature
10 metres – average length of human digestive tract
12 metres – length of a whale shark, largest living fish
12 metres – wingspan of a Quetzalcoatlus, a pterosaur
13 metres – length of a giant squid and colossal squid, the largest living invertebrates
15 metres – approximate distance the tropical circles of latitude are moving towards the equator and the polar circles are moving towards the poles each year due to a natural, gradual decrease in the Earth's axial tilt
18 metres – height of a Sauroposeidon, the tallest-known dinosaur
20 metres – length of a Leedsichthys, the largest-known fish to have lived
21 metres – height of High Force waterfall in England
33 metres – length of a blue whale, the largest animal on earth, living or extinct, in terms of mass
39 metres – length of a Supersaurus, the longest-known dinosaur and longest vertebrate
52 metres – height of Niagara Falls
55 metres – length of a bootlace worm, the longest-known animal
66 metres - highest possible sea level rise due to a complete melting of all ice on Earth
83 metres – height of a Western hemlock

Astronomical
30.8568 metres – 1 femtoparsec
32 metres – approximate diameter of 2008 HJ, a small meteoroid

1 hectometre

The  is a unit of length in the metric system equal to 100 metres (102 m). 
To compare different orders of magnitude this section lists lengths between 100 metres and 1,000 metres (1 kilometre).

Conversions
100 metres (sometimes termed a hectometre) is equal to:

328 feet
one side of a 1 hectare square
a fifth of a modern li, a Chinese unit of measurement
the approximate distance travelled by light in 300 nanoseconds

Human-defined scales and structures
100 metres – wavelength of the highest medium wave radio frequency, 3 MHz
100 metres – spacing of location marker posts on British motorways
138.8 metres – height of the Great Pyramid of Giza (Pyramid of Cheops)
139 metres – height of the world's tallest roller coaster, Kingda Ka
187 metres – shortest wavelength of the broadcast radio AM band, 1600 kHz
202 metres – length of the Széchenyi Chain Bridge connecting Buda and Pest
318 metres – height of The New York Times Building
318.9 metres – height of the Chrysler Building
328 metres – height of Auckland's Sky Tower, the tallest free-standing structure in the Southern Hemisphere
330 metres – height of the Eiffel Tower (including antenna)
341 metres – height of the world's tallest bridge, the Millau Viaduct
390 metres – height of the Empire State Building
400–800 metres – heights of the world's tallest skyscrapers of the past 80 years
458 metres – length of the Knock Nevis, the world's largest supertanker
553.33 metres – height of the CN Tower
555 metres – longest wavelength of the broadcast radio AM band, 540 kHz
630 metres – height of the KVLY-TV mast, second-tallest structure in the world
646 metres – height of the Warsaw radio mast, the world's tallest structure until its collapse in 1991
828 metres – height of Burj Khalifa, world's tallest structure on 17 January 2009
1,000 metres – wavelength of the lowest mediumwave radio frequency, 300 kHz

Sports
100 metres – the distance a very fast human can run in about 10 seconds
100.584 metres – length of a Canadian football field between the goal lines (110 yards)
91.5 metres – 137 metres – length of a soccer field
105 metres – length of football pitch (UEFA stadium categories 3 and 4)
105 metres – length of a typical football field
109.73 metres – total length of an American football field (120 yards, including the end zones)
110–150 metres – the width of an Australian football field
135–185 metres – the length of an Australian football field
137.16 metres – total length of a Canadian football field, including the end zones (150 yards)

Nature
115.5 metres – height of the world's tallest tree in 2007, the Hyperion sequoia
310 metres – maximum depth of Lake Geneva
340 metres – distance sound travels in air at sea level in one second; see Speed of sound
979 metres – height of the Salto Angel, the world's highest free-falling waterfall (Venezuela)
1500 metres – distance sound travels in water in one second

Astronomical
270 metres – length of 99942 Apophis
535 metres – length of 25143 Itokawa, a small asteroid visited by a spacecraft

1 kilometre

The  is a unit of length in the metric system equal to  metres (103 m). 
To help compare different orders of magnitude, this section lists lengths between 1 kilometre and 10 kilometres (103 and 104 metres).

Conversions
1 kilometre (unit symbol km) is equal to:

1,000 metres
0.621371 miles
1,093.61 yards
3,280.84 feet
39,370.1 inches
100,000 centimetres
1,000,000 millimetres
Side of a square of area 1 km2
Radius of a circle of area π km2

Human-defined scales and structures
1 km – wavelength of the highest long wave radio frequency, 300 kHz
1.280 km – span of the Golden Gate Bridge (distance between towers)
1.609 km – 1 statute mile
1.852 km – 1 nautical mile, equal to 1 arcminute of latitude at the surface of the Earth
1.991 km – span of the Akashi Kaikyō Bridge
2.309 km – axial length of the Three Gorges Dam, the largest dam in the world
3.991 km – length of the Akashi Kaikyō Bridge, longest suspension bridge in the world 
5.072 km – height of Tanggula Mountain Pass, below highest peak in the Tanggula Mountains, highest railway pass in the world 
5.727 km – height of Cerro Aucanquilcha, highest road in the world, located in Chile
98 airports have paved runways from 4 km to 5.5 km in length.
8 km – length of Palm Jebel Ali, an artificial island built off the coast of Dubai
9.8 km – length of The World, an artificial archipelago that is also built off the coast of Dubai, whose islands resemble a world map

Geographical

1.637 km – deepest dive of Lake Baikal in Russia, the world's largest freshwater lake
2.228 km – height of Mount Kosciuszko, highest point on mainland Australia
Most of Manhattan is from 3 to 4 km wide.
4.810 km – height of Mont Blanc, highest peak in the Alps
4.884 km – height of Carstensz Pyramid, highest peak in Oceania
4.892 km – height of Mount Vinson, highest peak in Antarctica
5.610 km – height of Mount Damavand, highest peak in Iran
5.642 km – height of Mount Elbrus, highest peak in Europe
5.895 km – height of Mount Kilimanjaro, highest peak in Africa
6.081 km – height of Mount Logan, highest peak in Canada
6.190 km – height of Denali, highest peak in North America
6.959 km – height of Aconcagua, highest peak in South America
7.5 km – depth of Cayman Trench, deepest point in the Caribbean Sea
8.848 km – height of Mount Everest, highest peak on Earth, on the border between Nepal and China

Astronomical
1 km – diameter of 1620 Geographos
1 km – very approximate size of the smallest-known moons of Jupiter
1.4 km – diameter of Dactyl, the first confirmed asteroid moon
4.8 km – diameter of 5535 Annefrank, an inner belt asteroid
5 km – diameter of 3753 Cruithne
5 km – length of PSR B1257+12
8 km – diameter of Themisto, one of Jupiter's moons
8 km – diameter of the Vela Pulsar
8.6 km – diameter of Callirrhoe, also known as Jupiter XVII
9.737 km – length of PSR B1919+21

10 kilometres

To help compare different orders of magnitude, this section lists lengths between 10 and 100 kilometres (104 to 105 metres). The myriametre (sometimes also spelled myriometre; 10,000 metres) is a deprecated unit name; the decimal metric prefix myria- (sometimes also written as myrio-) is obsolete and not included among the prefixes when the International System of Units was introduced in 1960.

Conversions
10 kilometres is equal to:

10,000 metres
6.2 miles
1 mil (the Scandinavian mile), now standardized as 10 km:
1 mil, the unit of measure commonly used in Norway and Sweden used to be 11,295 m in Norway and 10,688 m in Sweden.
farsang, unit of measure commonly used in Iran and Turkey

Sports
42.195 km – length of the marathon

Human-defined scales and structures
18 km – cruising altitude of Concorde
27 km – circumference of the Large Hadron Collider,  the largest and highest energy particle accelerator
34.668 km – highest manned balloon flight (Malcolm D. Ross and Victor E. Prather on 4 May 1961)
38.422 km – length of the Second Lake Pontchartrain Causeway in Louisiana, US
39 km – undersea portion of the Channel tunnel
53.9 km – length of the Seikan Tunnel, the longest rail tunnel in the world
77 km – rough total length of the Panama Canal

Geographical
10 km – height of Mauna Kea in Hawaii, measured from its base on the ocean floor
11 km – deepest-known point of the ocean, Challenger Deep in the Mariana Trench
11 km – average height of the troposphere
14 km – width of the Gibraltar strait
21 km – length of Manhattan
23 km – depth of the largest earthquake ever recorded in the United Kingdom, in 1931 at the Dogger Bank of the North Sea
34 km – narrowest width of the English Channel at the Strait of Dover
50 km – approximate height of the stratosphere
90 km – width of the Bering Strait

Astronomical
10 km – diameter of the most massive neutron stars (3–5 solar masses)
13 km – mean diameter of Deimos, the smaller moon of Mars
20 km – diameter of the least massive neutron stars (1.44 solar masses)
20 km – diameter of Leda, one of Jupiter's moons
20 km – diameter of Pan, one of Saturn's moons
22 km – diameter of Phobos, the larger moon of Mars
27 km – height of Olympus Mons above the Mars reference level, the highest-known mountain of the Solar System
30.8568 km – 1 picoparsec
43 km – diameter difference of Earth's equatorial bulge
66 km – diameter of Naiad, the innermost of Neptune's moons

100 kilometres

A length of 100 kilometres (about 62 miles), as a rough amount, is relatively common in measurements on Earth and for some astronomical objects.
It is the altitude at which the FAI defines spaceflight to begin.

To help compare orders of magnitude, this section lists lengths between 100 and 1,000 kilometres (105 and 106 metres).

Conversions
A distance of 100 kilometres is equal to about 62 miles (or ).

Human-defined scales and structures

100 km – the Karman line: the internationally-recognized boundary of outer space
105 km – distance from Giridih to Bokaro
109 km – length of High Speed 1 between London and the Channel Tunnel
130 km – range of a Scud-A missile
163 km – length of the Suez Canal
164 km – length of the Danyang–Kunshan Grand Bridge
213 km – length of Paris Métro
217 km – length of the Grand Union Canal
223 km – length of the Madrid Metro
300 km – range of a Scud-B missile
386 km – altitude of the International Space Station
408 km – length of the London Underground (active track)
460 km – distance from London to Paris
470 km – distance from Dublin to London as the crow flies
600 km – range of a Scud-C missile
600 km – height above ground of the Hubble Space Telescope
804.67 km – (500 miles) distance of the Indy 500 automobile race

Geographical
111 km – distance covered by one degree of latitude on Earth's surface
180 km – distance between Mumbai and Nashik
203 km – length of Sognefjorden, the third-largest fjord in the world
220 km – distance between Pune and Nashik
240 km – widest width of the English Channel
430 km – length of the Pyrenees
500 km – widest width of Sweden from east to west
550 km – distance from San Francisco to Los Angeles as the crow flies
560 km – distance of Bordeaux–Paris, formerly the longest one-day professional cycling race
590 km – length of land boundary between Finland and Sweden
724 km – length of the Om River
871 km – distance from Sydney to Melbourne (along the Hume Highway)
897 km – length of the River Douro
900 km – distance from Berlin to Stockholm
956 km – distance from Washington, D.C. to Chicago, Illinois as the crow flies

Astronomical
100 km – the altitude at which the FAI defines spaceflight to begin
167 km – diameter of Amalthea, one of Jupiter's inner moons
200 km – width of Valles Marineris
220 km – diameter of Phoebe, the largest of Saturn's outer moons
300 km – the approximate distance travelled by light in one millisecond
340 km – diameter of Nereid, the third-largest moon of Neptune
350 km – lower bound of Low Earth orbit
420 km – diameter of Proteus, the second-largest moon of Neptune
468 km – diameter of the asteroid 4 Vesta
472 km – diameter of Miranda, one of Uranus's major moons
974.6 km – greatest diameter of 1 Ceres, the largest Solar System asteroid

1 megametre

The  is a unit of length in the metric system equal to  metres (106 m). 
To help compare different orders of magnitude, this section lists lengths starting at 106 m (1 Mm or 1,000 km).

Conversions
1 megametre is equal to:
1 E+6 m (one million metres)
approximately 621.37 miles
Side of square with area 1,000,000 km2

Human-defined scales and structures
2.100 Mm – Length of proposed gas pipeline from Iran to India via Pakistan
2.100 Mm – Distance from Casablanca to Rome
2.288 Mm – Length of the official Alaska Highway when it was built in the 1940s
3.069 Mm – Length of Interstate 95 (from Houlton, Maine to Miami, Florida)
3.846 Mm – Length of U.S. Route 1 (from Fort Kent, Maine to Key West, Florida)
5.000 Mm – Width of the United States
5.007 Mm – Estimated length of Interstate 90 (Seattle, Washington to Boston, Massachusetts)
5.614 Mm – Length of the Australian Dingo Fence
6.371 Mm – Global-average Earth radius
6.4 Mm – Length of the Great Wall of China
7.821 Mm – Length of the Trans-Canada Highway, the world's longest national highway (from Victoria, British Columbia to St. John's, Newfoundland)
8.836 Mm – Road distance between Prudhoe Bay, Alaska, and Key West, Florida, the endpoints of the U.S. road network
8.852 Mm – Aggregate length of the Great Wall of China, including trenches, hills and rivers
9.259 Mm – Length of the Trans-Siberian railway

Sports
The Munda Biddi Trail in WA, Australia is over 1,000 km long – the world's longest off-road cycle trail
1.200 Mm – the length of the Paris–Brest–Paris bicycling event
Several endurance auto races are, or were, run for 1,000 km:
Bathurst 1000
1000 km Brands Hatch
1000 km Buenos Aires
1000 km Donington
1000 km Monza
1000 km Nürburgring
1000 km Silverstone
1000 km Spa
1000 km Suzuka
1000 km Zeltweg

Geographical
1.010 Mm – Distance from San Diego to El Paso as the crow flies
2.000 Mm – Distance from Beijing to Hong Kong as the crow flies
2.800 Mm – Narrowest width of Atlantic Ocean (Brazil-West Africa)
2.850 Mm – Length of the Danube river
2.205 Mm – Length of Sweden's total land boundaries
2.515 Mm – Length of Norway's total land boundaries
3.690 Mm – Length of the Volga river, longest in Europe
4.350 Mm – Length of the Yellow River
4.800 Mm – Widest width of Atlantic Ocean (U.S.-Northern Africa)
5.100 Mm – Distance from Dublin to New York as the crow flies
6.270 Mm – Length of the Mississippi-Missouri River system
6.380 Mm – Length of the Yangtze River
6.400 Mm – Length of the Amazon River
6.758 Mm – Length of the Nile system, longest on Earth
8.200 Mm – Approximate Distance from Dublin to San Francisco

Astronomical
1.000 Mm – Estimated shortest axis of triaxial dwarf planet 
1.186 Mm – Diameter of Charon, the largest moon of Pluto
1.280 Mm – Diameter of the trans-Neptunian object 50000 Quaoar
1.436 Mm – Diameter of Iapetus, one of Saturn's major moons
1.578 Mm – Diameter of Titania, the largest of Uranus's moons
1.960 Mm – Estimated longest axis of Haumea
2.326 Mm – Diameter of the dwarf planet Eris, the largest trans-Neptunian object found to date
2.376 Mm – Diameter of Pluto
2.707 Mm – Diameter of Triton, largest moon of Neptune
3.122 Mm – Diameter of Europa, the smallest Galilean satellite of Jupiter
3.476 Mm – Diameter of Earth's Moon
3.643 Mm – Diameter of Io, a moon of Jupiter
4.821 Mm – Diameter of Callisto, a moon of Jupiter
4.879 Mm – Diameter of Mercury
5.150 Mm – Diameter of Titan, the largest moon of Saturn
5.262 Mm – Diameter of Jupiter's moon Ganymede, the largest moon in the Solar System
6.371 Mm – Radius of Earth
6.792 Mm – Diameter of Mars

10 megametres

To help compare different orders of magnitude, this section lists lengths starting at 107 metres (10 megametres or 10,000 kilometres).

Conversions
10 megametres (10 Mm) is
6,215 miles
side of a square of area 100,000,000 square kilometres (km2)
radius of a circle of area 314,159,265 km2

Human-defined scales and structures

11.085 Mm – Length of the Kyiv-Vladivostok railway, a longer variant of the Trans-Siberian railway
13.300 Mm – Length of roads rehabilitated and widened under the National Highway Development Project (launched in 1998) in India
39.000 Mm – Length of the SEA-ME-WE 3 optical submarine telecommunications cable, joining 39 points between Norden, Germany and Okinawa, Japan
67.000 Mm – Total length of National Highways in India
80.000 Mm – 20,000 (metric, French) leagues (see Jules Verne, Twenty Thousand Leagues Under the Sea)

Geographical
10 Mm – Approximate altitude of the outer boundary of the exosphere
10.001 Mm – Length of the meridian arc from the North Pole to the Equator (the original definition of the metre was based on this length)
60.000 Mm – Total length of the mid-ocean ridges

Astronomical
12.000 Mm – Diameter of Sirius B, a white dwarf
12.104 Mm – Diameter of Venus
12.742 Mm – Diameter of Earth
12.900 Mm – Minimum distance of the meteoroid  from the centre of Earth on 31 March 2004, closest on record
14.000 Mm – Smallest diameter of Jupiter's Great Red Spot
19.000 Mm – Separation between Pluto and Charon
30.8568 Mm – 1 nanoparsec
34.770 Mm – Minimum distance of the asteroid 99942 Apophis on 13 April 2029 from the centre of Earth
35.786 Mm – Altitude of geostationary orbit
40.005 Mm – Polar circumference of the Earth
40.077 Mm – Equatorial circumference of the Earth
49.528 Mm – Diameter of Neptune
51.118 Mm – Diameter of Uranus

100 megametres

To help compare different orders of magnitude, this section lists lengths starting at 108 metres (100 megametres or 100,000 kilometres or 62,150 miles).

102 Mm – Diameter of HD 149026 b, an unusually dense Jovian planet
115 Mm – Width of Saturn's Rings
120 Mm – Diameter of EBLM J0555-57Ab, the smallest-known star
120 Mm – Diameter of Saturn
142 Mm – Diameter of Jupiter, the largest planet in the Solar System
170 Mm – Diameter of TRAPPIST-1, a star recently discovered to have seven planets around it
174 Mm – Diameter of OGLE-TR-122b
180 Mm – Average distance covered during life
196 Mm – Diameter of Proxima Centauri, a typical red dwarf
257 Mm – Diameter of TrES-4 b
272 Mm – Diameter of WASP-12b
299.792 Mm – One light-second; the distance light travels in vacuum in one second (see speed of light)
300 Mm – Diameter of WASP-79b
314 Mm – Diameter of CT Cha b
384.4 Mm (238,855 mi) – Average Earth-Moon distance
671 Mm – Separation between Jupiter and Europa
428 Mm – Diameter of GQ Lupi b, one of the largest-known planets
986 Mm – Diameter of HD 100546 b's surrounding disk

1 gigametre

The  is a unit of length in the metric system equal to  metres (109 m). 
To help compare different distances this section lists lengths starting at 109 metres (1 gigametre (Gm) or 1 billion metres).

1.2 Gm – Separation between Saturn and Titan
1.39 Gm – Diameter of Sun
1.5 Gm – (proposed) Expected orbit from Earth of the James Webb Space Telescope
2.19 Gm – Closest approach of Comet Lexell to Earth, happened on 1 July 1770; closest comet approach on record
3 Gm – Total length of "wiring" in the human brain
4.2 Gm – Diameter of Algol B
5.0 Gm – Closest approach of Comet Halley to Earth, happened on 10 April 837
5.0 Gm – (proposed) Size of the arms of the giant triangle shaped Michelson interferometer of the Laser Interferometer Space Antenna (LISA) planned to start observations sometime in the 2030s.
7.9 Gm – Diameter of Gamma Orionis
9.0 Gm – Estimated diameter of the event horizon of Sagittarius A*, the supermassive black hole in the center of the Milky Way galaxy

10 gigametres

To help compare different distances this section lists lengths starting at 1010 metres (10 gigametres (Gm) or 10 million kilometres, or 0.07 astronomical units).

15 Gm – Closest distance of Comet Hyakutake from Earth
18 Gm – One light-minute (see yellow sphere in right-hand diagram)
24 Gm – Radius of a heliostationary orbit
30.8568 Gm – 1 microparsec
46 Gm – Perihelion distance of Mercury (yellow ellipse on the right)
55 Gm – 60,000-year perigee of Mars (last achieved on 27 August 2003)
55 Gm – Radius of Rigel, a blue supergiant star (largest star on right)
58 Gm – Average passing distance between Earth and Mars at the moment they overtake each other in their orbits
61 Gm – Diameter of Aldebaran, an orange giant star (large star on right)
70 Gm – Aphelion distance of Mercury
76 Gm – Neso's apocentric distance; greatest distance of a natural satellite from its parent planet (Neptune)

100 gigametres

To help compare distances at different orders of magnitude this section lists lengths starting at 1011 metres (100 gigametre or 100 million kilometres or 0.7 astronomical units).

109 Gm (0.7 au) Distance between Venus and the Sun
149.6 Gm (93.0 million mi; 1.0 au) – Distance between the Earth and the Sun – the original definition of the astronomical unit
180 Gm (1.2 au) – Maximum diameter of Sagittarius A*, the supermassive black hole in the center of Milky Way galaxy
228 Gm (1.5 au) – Distance between Mars and the Sun
570 Gm (3.8 au) – Length of the tail of Comet Hyakutake measured by Ulysses; the actual value could be much higher
591 Gm (4.0 au) – Minimum distance between the Earth and Jupiter
780 Gm (5.2 au) – Distance between Jupiter and the Sun
947 Gm (6.4 au) – Diameter of Antares A
965 Gm (6.4 au) – Maximum distance between the Earth and Jupiter

1 terametre

The  is a unit of length in the metric system equal to  metres  (1012 m). 
To help compare different distances, this section lists lengths starting at 1012 m (1 Tm or 1 billion km or 6.7 astronomical units).

1.079 Tm – 7.2 au – One light-hour
1.4 Tm – 9.5 au – Distance between Saturn and the Sun
1.5 Tm – 10 au – Estimated diameter of VV Cephei A, a red supergiant.
1.83 Tm – 12.2 au – Diameter of HR 5171 A, the largest-known yellow hypergiant star although the latest research suggests it is a red hypergiant with a diameter about 2.1 Tm (14 au)
2 Tm – 13.2 au – Estimated diameter of VY Canis Majoris, one of the largest-known stars
2.9 Tm – 19.4 au – Distance between Uranus and the Sun
4.4 Tm – 29.4 au – Perihelion distance of Pluto
4.5 Tm – 30.1 au – Distance between Neptune and the Sun
4.5 Tm – 30.1 au – Inner radius of the Kuiper belt
5.7 Tm – 38.1 au – Perihelion distance of Eris
7.3 Tm – 48.8 au – Aphelion distance of Pluto
7.5 Tm – 50.1 au – Outer radius of the Kuiper Belt

10 terametres

To help compare different distances this section lists lengths starting at 1013 m (10 Tm or 10 billion km or 67 astronomical units).
10 Tm – 67 AU – Diameter of a hypothetical quasi-star
11.1 Tm – 74.2 AU – Distance that Voyager 1 began detecting returning particles from termination shock
11.4 Tm – 76.2 AU – Perihelion distance of 90377 Sedna
12.1 Tm – 70 to 90 AU – Distance to termination shock (Voyager 1 crossed at 94 AU)
12.9 Tm – 86.3 AU – Distance to 90377 Sedna in March 2014
13.2 Tm – 88.6 AU – Distance to Pioneer 11 in March 2014
14.1 Tm – 94.3 AU – Estimated radius of the Solar System
14.4 Tm – 96.4 AU – Distance to Eris in March 2014 (now near its aphelion)
15.1 Tm – 101 AU – Distance to heliosheath
16.5 Tm – 111 AU – Distance to Pioneer 10 as of March 2014
16.6 Tm – 111.2 AU – Distance to Voyager 2 as of May 2016
20.0 Tm – 135 AU – Distance to Voyager 1 as of May 2016
20.6 Tm – 138 AU – Distance to Voyager 1 as of late February 2017
21.1 Tm – 141 AU – Distance to Voyager 1 as of November 2017
25.9 Tm – 173 AU – One light-day
30.8568 Tm – 206.3 AU – 1 milliparsec
55.7 Tm – 371 AU – Aphelion distance of the comet Hale-Bopp

100 terametres

To help compare different distances this section lists lengths starting at 1014 m (100 Tm or 100 billion km or 670 astronomical units).

140 Tm – 937 AU – Aphelion distance of 90377 Sedna
172 Tm – 1150 AU – Schwarzschild diameter of H1821+643, one of the most massive black holes known
181 Tm – 1210 AU – One light-week
308.568 Tm – 2063 AU –  1 centiparsec
757 Tm – 5059 AU – radius of the Stingray Nebula
777 Tm – 5180 AU – One light-month

1 petametre

The  is a unit of length in the metric system equal to 1015 metres. 
To help compare different distances this section lists lengths starting at 1015 m (1 Pm or 1 trillion km or 6685 astronomical units (AU) or 0.11 light-years).

1.0 Pm = 0.105702341 light-years
1.9 Pm ± 0.5 Pm = 12,000 AU = 0.2 light-year radius of Cat's Eye Nebula's inner core
3.08568 Pm = 20,626 AU = 1 deciparsec
4.7 Pm = 30,000 AU = half-light-year diameter of Bok globule Barnard 68
7.5 Pm – 50,000 AU – Possible outer boundary of Oort cloud (other estimates are 75,000 to 125,000 or even 189,000 AU (1.18, 2, and 3 light-years, respectively))
9.5 Pm – 63,241.1 AU – One light-year, the distance traveled by light in one year
9.9 Pm – 66,000 AU – Aphelion distance of the C/1999 F1 (Catalina)

10 petametres

To help compare different distances this section lists lengths starting at 1016 m (10 Pm or 66,800 AU, 1.06 light-years).

15 Pm – 1.59 light-years – Possible outer radius of Oort cloud
20 Pm – 2.11 light-years – maximum extent of influence of the Sun's gravitational field
30.9 Pm – 3.26 light-years – 1 parsec
39.9 Pm – 4.22 light-years – Distance to Proxima Centauri (nearest star to Sun)
81.3 Pm – 8.59 light-years – Distance to Sirius

100 petametres

To help compare different distances this section lists lengths between 1017 m (100 Pm or 11 light-years) and 1018 m (106 light-years).
110 Pm – 12 light-years – Distance to Tau Ceti
230 Pm – 24 light-years – Diameter of the Orion Nebula
240 Pm – 25 light-years – Distance to Vega
260 Pm – 27 light-years – Distance to Chara, a star approximately as bright as the Sun. Its faintness gives an idea how the Sun would appear when viewed from this distance.
308.568 Tm – 32.6 light-years – 1 dekaparsec
350 Pm – 37 light-years – Distance to Arcturus
373.1 Pm – 39.44 light-years – Distance to TRAPPIST-1, a star recently discovered to have 7 planets around it
400 Pm – 42 light-years – Distance to Capella
620 Pm – 65 light-years – Distance to Aldebaran
750 Pm – 79.36 light-years – Distance to Regulus
900 Pm – 92.73 light-years – Distance to Algol

1 exametre

The  is a unit of length in the metric system equal to 1018 metres. To help compare different distances this section lists lengths between 1018 m (1 Em or 105.7 light-years) and 1019 m (10 Em or 1,057 light-years).

1.2 Em – 129 light-years – Diameter of Messier 13 (a typical globular cluster)
1.6 Em – 172 ± 12.5 light-years – Diameter of Omega Centauri (one of the largest-known globular clusters, perhaps containing over a million stars)
3.08568 Em – 326.1 light-years – 1 hectoparsec
3.1 Em – 310 light-years – Distance to Canopus according to Hipparcos

6.1 Em – 640 light-years – Distance to Betelgeuse according to Hipparcos
6.2 Em – 650 light-years – Distance to the Helix Nebula, located in the constellation Aquarius
7.3 Em – 730 light-years – Distance to Rigel according to Hipparcos

10 exametres

To help compare different orders of magnitude, this section lists distances starting at 10 Em (1019 m or 1,100 light-years).

10.6 Em – 1,120 light-years – Distance to WASP-96b
13 Em – 1,300 light-years – Distance to the Orion Nebula
14 Em – 1,500 light-years – Approximate thickness of the plane of the Milky Way galaxy at the Sun's location
14.2 Em – 1,520 light-years – Diameter of the NGC 604
30.8568 Em – 3,261.6 light-years – 1 kiloparsec
31 Em – 3,200 light-years – Distance to Deneb according to Hipparcos
46 Em – 4,900 light-years – Distance to OGLE-TR-56, the first extrasolar planet discovered using the transit method
47 Em – 5,000 light-years – Distance to the Boomerang nebula, coldest place known (1 K)
53 Em – 5,600 light-years – Distance to the globular cluster M4 and the extrasolar planet PSR B1620-26 b within it
61 Em – 6,500 light-years – Distance to Perseus Spiral Arm (next spiral arm out in the Milky Way galaxy)
71 Em – 7,500 light-years – Distance to Eta Carinae

100 exametres
To help compare different orders of magnitude, this section lists distances starting at 100 Em (1020 m or 11,000 light-years).

150 Em – 16,000 light-years – Diameter of the Small Magellanic Cloud, a dwarf galaxy orbiting the Milky Way
200 Em – 21,500 light-years – Distance to OGLE-2005-BLG-390Lb, the most distant and the most Earth-like planet known
240 Em – 25,000 light-years – Distance to the Canis Major Dwarf Galaxy
260 Em – 28,000 light-years – Distance to the center of the Galaxy
830 Em – 88,000 light-years – Distance to the Sagittarius Dwarf Elliptical Galaxy

1 zettametre

The  is a unit of length in the metric system equal to 1021 metres. 
To help compare different orders of magnitude, this section lists distances starting at 1 Zm (1021 m or 110,000 light-years).

1.7 Zm – 179,000 light-years – Distance to the Large Magellanic Cloud, largest satellite galaxy of the Milky Way
<1.9 Zm – <200,000 light-years – Revised estimated diameter of the disc of the Milky Way Galaxy. The size was previously thought to be half of this.
2.0 Zm – 210,000 light-years – Distance to the Small Magellanic Cloud
2.8 Zm – 300,000 light-years – Distance to the Intergalactic Wanderer, one of the most distant globular clusters of Milky Way
8.5 Zm – 900,000 light-years – Distance to the Leo I Dwarf Galaxy, farthest-known Milky Way satellite galaxy

10 zettametres
To help compare different orders of magnitude, this section lists distances starting at 10 Zm (1022 m or 1.1 million light-years).

24 Zm – 2.5 million light-years – Distance to the Andromeda Galaxy
30.8568 Zm – 3.2616 million light-years – 1 megaparsec
40 Zm – 4.2 million light-years – Distance to the IC 10, a distant member of the Local Group of galaxies
49.2 Zm – 5.2 million light-years – Width of the Local Group of galaxies
95 Zm – 10 million light-years – Distance to the Sculptor Galaxy in the Sculptor Group of galaxies
95 Zm – 10 million light-years – Distance to the Maffei 1, the nearest giant elliptical galaxy in the Maffei 1 Group

100 zettametres
To help compare different orders of magnitude, this section lists distances starting at 100 Zm (1023 m or 11 million light-years).

140 Zm – 15 million light-years – Distance to Centaurus A galaxy
250 Zm – 27 million light-years – Distance to the Pinwheel Galaxy
280 Zm – 30 million light-years – Distance to the Sombrero Galaxy
570 Zm – 60 million light-years – Approximate distance to the Virgo cluster, nearest galaxy cluster
620 Zm – 65 million light-years – Approximate distance to the Fornax cluster
800 Zm – 85 million light-years – Approximate distance to the Eridanus cluster

1 yottametre
The  is a unit of length in the metric system equal to 1024 metres.

To help compare different orders of magnitude, this section lists distances starting at 1 Ym (1024 m or 105.702 million light-years).
1.2 Ym – 127 million light-years – Distance to the closest observed gamma ray burst GRB 980425
1.3 Ym – 137 million light-years – Distance to the Centaurus Cluster of galaxies, the nearest large supercluster
1.9 Ym – 201 million light-years – Diameter of the Local Supercluster
2.3 Ym – 225 to 250 million light-years – Distance light travels in vacuum in one galactic year
2.8 Ym – 296 million light-years – Distance to the Coma Cluster
3.15 Ym - 330 million  light years - Diameter of the Boötes Void
3.2 Ym – 338 million light-years – Distance to Stephan's Quintet
4.7 Ym – 496 million light-years – Length of the CfA2 Great Wall, one of the largest observed superstructures in the Universe
6.1 Ym – 645 million light-years – Distance to the Shapley Supercluster
9.5 Ym – 996 million light-years – Diameter of the Eridanus Supervoid

10 yottametres

To help compare different orders of magnitude, this section lists distances starting at 10 Ym (1025 m or 1.1 billion light-years). At this scale, expansion of the universe becomes significant. Distance of these objects are derived from their measured redshifts, which depends on the cosmological models used.

13 Ym – 1.37 billion light-years – Length of the South Pole Wall
13 Ym – 1.38 billion light-years – Length of the Sloan Great Wall
18 Ym – redshift 0.16 – 1.9 billion light-years – Distance to the quasar 3C 273 (light travel distance)
30.8568 Ym – 3.2616 billion light-years – 1 gigaparsec
31.2204106 Ym − 3.3 billion light-years − Length of The Giant Arc, a large cosmic structure discovered in 2021
33 Ym – 3.5 billion light-years – Maximum distance of the 2dF Galaxy Redshift Survey (light travel distance)
37.8 Ym – 4 billion light-years – Length of the Huge-LQG
75 Ym – redshift 0.95 – 8 billion light-years – Approximate distance to the supernova SN 2002dd in the Hubble Deep Field North (light travel distance)
85 Ym – redshift 1.6 – 9 billion light-years – Approximate distance to the gamma-ray burst GRB 990123 (light travel distance)
94.6 Ym – 10 billion light-years – Approximate distance to quasar OQ172
94.6 Ym – 10 billion light-years – Length of the Hercules–Corona Borealis Great Wall, one of the largest and most massive-known cosmic structures known

100 yottametres
To help compare different orders of magnitude, this section lists distances starting at 100 Ym (1026 m or 11 billion light-years). At this scale, expansion of the universe becomes significant. Distance of these objects are derived from their measured redshifts, which depend on the cosmological models used.

124 Ym – redshift 7.54 – 13.1 billion light-years – Light travel distance (LTD) to the quasar ULAS J1342+0928, the most distant-known quasar as of 2017
130 Ym – redshift 1,000 – 13.8 billion light-years – Distance (LTD) to the source of the cosmic microwave background radiation; radius of the observable universe measured as a LTD
260 Ym – 27.4 billion light-years – Diameter of the observable universe (double LTD)
440 Ym – 46 billion light-years – Radius of the universe measured as a comoving distance
590 Ym – 62 billion light-years – Cosmological event horizon: the largest comoving distance from which light will ever reach us (the observer) at any time in the future
886.48 Ym – 93.7 billion light-years – The diameter of the observable universe (twice the particle horizon); however, there might be unobserved distances that are even greater.

1 ronnametre
The  is a unit of length in the metric system equal to 1027 metres.

To help compare different orders of magnitude, this section lists distances starting at 1 Rm (1027 m or 110 billion light-years). At this scale, expansion of the universe becomes significant. Distance of these objects are derived from their measured redshifts, which depend on the cosmological models used.
>1 Rm - >105.7 billion light-years – Size of universe beyond the cosmic light horizon, depending on its curvature; if the curvature is zero (i.e. the universe is spatially flat), the value can be infinite (see Shape of the universe) as previously mentioned

See also
List of examples of lengths 
Fermi problem
Scale (analytical tool)
Spatial scale

Notes

References

External links
 How Big Are Things? – displays orders of magnitude in successively larger rooms.
 Powers of Ten – Travel across the Universe.
 Cosmos –  Journey from microcosmos to macrocosmos (Digital Nature Agency).
 Scale of the universe – interactive guide to length magnitudes
  – Orders of Magnitude (March 2020).

 
Length
Length
Lists by length